Mid Kent was a parliamentary constituency in the county of Kent, which returned two Members of Parliament to the House of Commons of the Parliament of the United Kingdom.

It was created for the 1868 general election, and abolished for the 1885 general election, when the three two-member constituencies (East Kent, Mid Kent and West Kent) were replaced by several new single-member constituencies: Ashford, Dartford, Faversham, Isle of Thanet, Medway, St Augustines, Sevenoaks and Tunbridge.

A later single-member constituency called Mid Kent existed from 1983 to 1997.

Boundaries
1868-1885: The Lathe of Aylesford, and the Lower Division of the Lathe of Scray.

Members of Parliament

Election results

Elections in the 1860s

Elections in the 1870s

Elections in the 1880s

 

Filmer's resignation caused a by-election.

Dyke's appointment as Chief Secretary to the Lord Lieutenant of Ireland required a by-election.

References 

Borough of Ashford
Borough of Dartford
Politics of Swale
Thanet
Sevenoaks District
Politics of the Borough of Tunbridge Wells
Politics of Medway
Parliamentary constituencies in Kent (historic)
Constituencies of the Parliament of the United Kingdom established in 1868
Constituencies of the Parliament of the United Kingdom disestablished in 1885